The Movimiento al Socialismo is a socialist political party in Bolivia.

Movimiento al Socialismo may refer to:

 Movimiento al Socialismo (Argentina)
 Movimiento al Socialismo (Honduras)
 Movimiento al Socialismo (Venezuela)